Icublabia multispinosa is a species of beetle in the family Cerambycidae, and the only species in the genus Icublabia. It was described by Galileo and Martins in 2003.

References

Desmiphorini
Beetles described in 2003
Monotypic beetle genera